Global Governance: A Review of Multilateralism and International Organizations is an academic quarterly journal. It was published by Lynne Rienner Publishers in the past, and is now published by Brill Publishers. It is published in association with the Academic Council of the United Nations System (ACUNS). According to the Journal Citation Reports, the journal has a 2014 impact factor of 1.016, ranking it 28th out of 85 journals in the category "International Relations".

See also 
 List of international relations journals

References

External links

 Lynne Rienner Publishers
 Acuns

Brill Publishers academic journals
Globalization-related journals
International relations journals
Quarterly journals